Vanucizumab (INN; development code RG7221) is an experimental humanized monoclonal antibody designed for the treatment of cancer.

Vanucizumab is a bi-specific monoclonal antibody composed of two different heavy chains and two different light chains. One arm of the antibody binds Angiopoietin-2 (Ang2) and the other is based on bevacizumab (Avastin), binding Vascular Endothelial Growth Factor A (VEGF-A). The antibody is designed to inhibit both VEGF-A and Ang2 simultaneously to offer superior clinical benefit compared to VEGF-A inhibition alone.

This drug was developed by Genentech/Roche.

References 

Monoclonal antibodies
Experimental cancer drugs